The IBM ThinkPad 220 is a subnotebook from the ThinkPad line by IBM. It was released in Japan only in 1993, and was jointly developed by IBM Japan Yamato Facility and IBM Japan and Ricoh joint project .

Specifications 
It is based on an Intel 386, has 2MB RAM and a 80MB disk, 6-row keyboard and trackball, and was only 1kg weight.

Successor 
The successor was the ThinkPad 230Cs with 7-row keyboard, trackpoint and with 1.7kg weight, released in 1994.

See also
 IBM Palm Top PC 110

References

External links 
 Thinkwiki.de - 220
 Japanese brochure

IBM laptops
ThinkPad